District 22 may refer to:

 District 22 (Chile)
 District 22 (Tehran)
 Texas Senate, District 22
 Florida's 22nd congressional district
 Texas's 22nd congressional district
 New York's 22nd congressional district
 California's 22nd congressional district
 Pennsylvania Senate, District 22
 Ohio's 22nd congressional district
 Maryland Legislative District 22